Gideon Levy (born 2 June 1953) is an Israeli journalist and author. Levy writes opinion pieces and a weekly column for the newspaper Haaretz that often focus on the Israeli occupation of the Palestinian territories. Levy has won prizes for his articles on human rights in the Israeli-occupied territories. His critics characterize him as left-wing and accuse him of being a propagandist for Hamas. In 2021, he won Israel's top award for journalism, the Sokolov Award.

Biography
Levy was born in 1953 in Tel Aviv.

Levy's father, Heinz (Zvi) Loewy, was born in the town of Saaz in the Sudetenland of Czechoslovakia, and earned a law degree from the University of Prague. He fled the Nazis in 1939 on a flight organized by two Slovakian Jews, together with 800 others. He spent six months on an illegal immigrant boat, the Frossoula, registered under a Panamanian flag, which was denied entry into Turkey and Palestine, and was permitted only temporary anchorage at Tripoli. He was then imprisoned in a detention camp at Beirut for six weeks. The group was then allowed to leave. During its journey, the ship was strafed by Royal Air Force planes, killing two passengers, after which the group was transferred to another ship, the Tiger Hill, which reached Mandate Palestine, where it ran aground at Tel-Aviv's Frischman Beach. His mother, Thea, from Ostrava, Czechoslovakia, was brought to Palestine in a rescue operation for children in 1939, and was placed in a kibbutz. His grandparents were murdered in the Holocaust. His father initially opened a bakery in Herzliya with his sister and worked as a newspaper deliveryman, but later found a job as an office clerk.

The family initially lived in poverty, but their lives became relatively comfortable when the German Holocaust reparations arrived. Levy attended Tel Aviv's Ironi Aleph High School. He and his younger brother Rafi often sang together, notably songs by Haim Hefer. During the Six-Day War in 1967, the street adjacent to his home was hit by Arab artillery. In 2007, Levy described his political views while a teenager as mainstream: "I was a full member of the nationalistic religious orgy. We all were under the feeling that the whole project [of Israel] is in an existentialistic danger. We all felt that another holocaust is around the corner."

Journalism and media career
Levy was drafted into the Israeli Defense Forces (IDF) in 1974 and served as a reporter for Israel Army Radio. From 1978 to 1982, he worked as an aide and spokesman for Shimon Peres, then the leader of the Israeli Labor Party. In 1982, he began to write for the Israeli daily Haaretz. In 1983–87, he was a deputy editor. Despite his coverage of the Israeli-Arab conflict, he speaks no Arabic. He has written a column called "Twilight Zone" about the hardships of the Palestinians since 1988. In 2004, Levy published a compilation of articles entitled Twilight Zone – Life and Death under the Israeli Occupation. With Haim Yavin, he co-edited Whispering Embers, a documentary series on Russian Jewry after the fall of communism. He hosted A Personal meeting with Gideon Levy, a weekly talk show that was broadcast on Israeli cable TV on channel 3, and has appeared periodically on other television talk shows.

Levy has said that his views on Israel's policies toward the Palestinians developed only after joining Haaretz. "When I first started covering the West Bank for Haaretz, I was young and brainwashed", he said in a 2009 interview. "I would see settlers cutting down olive trees and soldiers mistreating Palestinian women at the checkpoints, and I would think, 'These are exceptions, not part of government policy.' It took me a long time to see that these were not exceptions – they were the substance of government policy."

In an interview, he said he doubts that any newspaper in Israel other than Haaretz would give him the journalistic freedom to publish the kind of pieces he writes.

On the issue of copyright violations in journalism, Levy voiced support in June 2011 for Johann Hari, then writing for The Independent of London, who was accused of plagiarism, while confirming that Hari had lifted quotes from Levy's newspaper column.

Views and opinions
Levy defines himself as a "patriotic Israeli". He criticizes what he sees as Israeli society's moral blindness to the effects of its acts of war and occupation. He has referred to the construction of settlements on private Palestinian land as "the most criminal enterprise in [Israel's] history". He opposed the 2006 Lebanon War. In 2007, he said that the plight of Palestinians in the Gaza Strip, then under Israeli blockade, made him ashamed to be Israeli. "My modest mission is to prevent a situation in which many Israelis will be able to say 'We didn't know'", he has said.

Levy supports unilateral withdrawal from occupied Palestinian territories without concessions. "Israel is not being asked 'to give' anything to the Palestinians; it is only being asked to return – to return their stolen land and restore their trampled self-respect, along with their fundamental human rights and humanity."

Levy used to support a two-state solution, but now feels it has become untenable, and supports a one-state solution.

Levy wrote that the 2008–09 Gaza War was a failed campaign that did not achieve its objectives. "The conclusion is that Israel is a violent and dangerous country, devoid of all restraints and blatantly ignoring the resolutions of the United Nations Security Council, while not giving a hoot about international law", he wrote in an editorial.

In 2010, Levy described Hamas as a fundamentalist organization and held it responsible for the Qassam rockets fired at Israeli cities: "Hamas is to be blamed for launching the Qassams. This is unbearable. No sovereign state would have tolerated it. Israel had the right to react". "But the first question you have to ask yourselves", he continued, "is why Hamas launched the missiles. Before criticising Hamas I would rather criticise my own government which carries a much bigger responsibility for the occupation and conditions in Gaza [...] And our behaviour was unacceptable."

Levy supports boycotting Israel, saying it is "the Israeli patriot's final refuge". He has said that economic boycott is more important, but that he also supports academic and cultural boycott.

Reception

Praise
Levy's writing has earned him numerous awards, including the Emil Grunzweig Human Rights Award in 1996 from the Association for Civil Rights in Israel, the Anna Lindh Foundation Journalism Award in 2008 for an article he wrote about Palestinian children killed by Israeli forces, and the Peace Through Media Award in 2012. New York Times columnist Thomas Friedman has called him "a powerful liberal voice". In his review of Levy's book The Punishment of Gaza, journalist and literary critic Nicholas Lezard called him "an Israeli dedicated to saving his country's honour", but said "there is much of the story he leaves out". Le Monde and Der Spiegel have profiled Levy. "He has a global name. He may be [one of] the most famous and the most invited journalists in Israel", wrote Israeli journalist Ben-Dror Yemini.

In 2021, Levy was awarded Israel's top journalism award, the Sokolow Prize. In its citation, the prize committee wrote that Levy "presents original and independent positions that do not surrender to convention or social codes, and in doing so enriches the public discourse fearlessly."

Criticism
Levy has been criticized for being anti-Israeli and supporting Palestinian radicalism. "Is it wrong to ask of reporters in a country that is in the midst of a difficult war to show a little more empathy for their people and their country?" asked Amnon Dankner of the Maariv newspaper. Ben-Dror Yemini, the editor of the opinion page of Maariv, called Levy one of the "propagandists for the Hamas". Itamar Marcus, director of Palestinian Media Watch, wrote "[One of] the current Israeli heroes [of the Hamas], from whom the Palestinians garner support for their ways, [is] Gideon Levy". In 2008, Arutz Sheva reported that Levy's article about the Jerusalem bulldozer attack was translated into Arabic for a Hamas website. In 2006, Gideon Ezra, Israel's former deputy Minister of Internal Security, suggested that the General Security Services should monitor Levy as a borderline security risk.

In 2002, Israeli novelist Irit Linur set off a wave of subscription cancellations to Haaretz when she wrote an open letter to the paper cancelling her own subscription. "It is a person's right to be a radical leftist, and publish a newspaper in accordance with his world view... However Haaretz has reached the point where its anti-Zionism has become stupid and evil", she wrote. She also accused Levy of amateurism because he does not speak Arabic.

Other public figures also cancelled their subscriptions, including Roni Daniel, the military and security correspondent for Israeli Channel 2. Levy himself joked that there is a thick file of anti-Levy cancellations in the Haaretz newsroom.

In an open letter to Levy in 2009, Israeli author A. B. Yehoshua, formerly a supporter of Levy, described his comparison of Gazan-Israeli death tolls as absurd and questioned his motives.

In 2013, Levy published an article about what he views as a disgraceful attitude towards African asylum seekers in Israel. In considering the reasons for this attitude, he wrote, "This time the issue is not security, Israel’s state religion. Nor are still talking about a flood of refugees, because the border with Egypt has been closed. So the only explanation for this disgraceful treatment lies in the national psyche. The migrants' color is the problem. A million immigrants from Russia, a third of them non-Jews, some of whom were also found to have a degree of alcohol and crime in their blood, were not a problem. Tens of thousands of Africans are the ultimate threat." Levy's remarks about Russians produced accusations of racism from Eddie Zhensker, executive director of the Russian advocacy NGO Morashtenu, who accused Levy of "brute and coarse prejudices". Immigrant Absorption Minister Sofa Landver demanded that Levy be placed on trial. Levy later apologised to those who were offended, but claimed that the real problem was that he had called Russian "immigrants" instead of "olim" and compared them to Africans.

During the 2014 Israel–Gaza conflict the chairman of the Likud Yisrael Beiteinu faction in the Knesset, Yariv Levin, called for Levy to be put on trial for treason.

In February 2016, after Levy criticized the Israel Labor Party, its Secretary General, Yehiel Bar, wrote in Haaretz that Levy is a Trojan horse: "Sad, that Levy who used to be a moral compass, became a broken compass: at all time, with no connection to circumstances or reality, Levy's compass points negative, points despair, points irrelevant". Bar added that Levy regards Palestinians as uneducated children who are exempted of any responsibility to their actions.

Private life
Levy resides in the Ramat Aviv neighborhood of Tel Aviv, on a site that was, before 1948, part of the Palestinian Arab village of Sheikh Munis. He is a divorced father of two. He says his sons do not share his politics and do not read anything he writes. He has received death threats.

Published works
 Twilight Zone – Life and Death under the Israeli Occupation. 1988–2003. Tel Aviv: Babel Press, 2004 , 
The Punishment of Gaza, Verso Books, 2010,

Awards
Emil Grunzweig Peace Award.
2003: Sparkasse Leipzig Prize Media Award
2007: Euro-Med Journalist Prize for Cultural Dialogue
5 May 2012: Peace Through Media Award at the eighth annual International Media Awards
7 January 2016: Olof Palme Prize, shared with Palestinian pastor Mitri Raheb, for their "fight against occupation and violence"
9 November 2021: Sokolov Award.

References

External links

 
 Selection of articles by Levy
 
 
 
 
Is Gideon Levy the most hated man in Israel or just the most heroic?. Interview by Johann Hari, The Independent, 24 September 2010

 

1953 births
Living people
Israeli columnists
Israeli Jews
Israeli journalists
Israeli people of Czech-Jewish descent
Israeli people of German-Jewish descent
Israeli political writers
Writers from Tel Aviv
Haaretz people
Writers on the Middle East